Gregory Dallas Chaney (born July 21, 1981) is an American attorney and politician serving as a Republican member of the Idaho House of Representatives from the 10B district. He assumed office in 2014.

Early life and education
Chaney graduated from Kuna High School, being active in Future Farmers of America and 4-H. Chaney attended Boise State University where he received a B.A. in communications and political science and Concordia University School of Law where he earned his Juris Doctor.

Career 
Chaney worked with the Nampa Police Department from April 2007 to July 2007.  Chaney also served in the United States Marine Corps Reserve. Currently, Chaney is an attorney and owns his own law firm in Caldwell.

Chaney chaired the House Judiciary Committee when he served in the Idaho Legislature, but it is currently chaired by Representative Bruce Skaug.   He maintains that Idaho Freedom Foundation supported members of the Republican Party are more willing to engage in personal attacks and mislead the public which makes it more difficult to pass certain bills and maintain a unified party.

Elections 
In 2014, Chaney faced two write-in candidates, Brian Bishop and Kent Marmon, during the Republican primary, defeating both with 58.8% of the vote. Challengers Leif Skyving (Democrat), Gordon Council (Independent) and Eugene Smith (Libertarian) were defeated in the general election where Chaney won with 53.6% of the vote.

In 2016, Chaney was unopposed in the Republican primary. He defeated Warren T. Stevens with 67.42% in the general election.

In 2022, Chaney ran and lost in the open Senate seat (due to redistricting) in Caldwell District 11.

Personal life
In 2009, Chaney was convicted of malicious injury to property after a dispute that ensued with his then girlfriend. He divorced the woman involved in the 2009 incident and entered into a new marriage and joined a church. He credits God for turning his life around.

In 2021 Chaney's unvaccinated, 74-year-old mother died from a COVID-19 infection after spending three days in ICU, and he believes that his mother was misled by misinformation about the COVID 19 vaccines.

References

External links
Greg Chaney at the Idaho Legislature

Republican Party members of the Idaho House of Representatives
1981 births
People from Hermiston, Oregon
Living people
Boise State University alumni
Concordia University alumni
21st-century American politicians
People from Canyon County, Idaho
Idaho politicians convicted of crimes